Christian Allen is an American video game designer. He is most noted for his contributions to the Ghost Recon franchise and Halo: Reach. Allen became Lead Designer on Tom Clancy's Ghost Recon 2 and continued in that role through Tom Clancy's Ghost Recon Advanced Warfighter, becoming Creative Director on Tom Clancy's Ghost Recon Advanced Warfighter 2.  Since 2017, Allen has served as a technology evangelist for Epic Games.

Allen started his career as a modder in the late 1990s.  He started making mods for Rainbow Six for fun and for his friends.

Allen left Red Storm Entertainment in summer of 2007 and moved to Bungie, where he took the role of Lead Designer on Halo: Reach. Allen left Bungie during development of Halo: Reach, joining WB Games to work on Middle-earth: Shadow of Mordor as Design Director.

Allen announced in March 2012 that he had started a company called Serellan LLC in order to produce a hardcore tactical shooter, successfully raising over $220,000 on Kickstarter. The shooter, named Takedown: Red Sabre, was released on September 20, 2013 on PC and February 21, 2014 on Xbox 360 Live Arcade.

In August 2015, Allen announced that Serellan LLC would be releasing a new title, named Epsilon. It was released on Steam Early Access on October 1, 2015. In March 2016, Allen built and released Hotel Blind with Bella Ryse on Steam, which he describes as a "about a blind man in a hotel room."  In September 2016, Allen announced he had ported Hotel Blind to virtual reality platforms.

In October 2017, Allen announced that he had joined Epic Games as a tech evangelist.

Notable game credits
 Tom Clancy's Rainbow Six: Athena Sword (2003)
 Tom Clancy's Ghost Recon: Island Thunder (2003)
 Tom Clancy's Ghost Recon: Jungle Storm (2004)
 Tom Clancy's Ghost Recon 2 (2004)
 Tom Clancy's Ghost Recon 2: Summit Strike (2005)
 Tom Clancy's Ghost Recon Advanced Warfighter (2006)
 Tom Clancy's Ghost Recon Advanced Warfighter 2 (2007)
 F.E.A.R. 2: Reborn (2009)
 Tom Clancy's Ghost Recon Predator (2010)
 Halo: Reach (2010)
 Tom Clancy's Ghost Recon: Future Soldier (2012)
 TAKEDOWN: Red Sabre (2013)
 Middle-earth: Shadow of Mordor (2014)
 Mad Max (2015 video game) (2015)
 Epsilon (2015)
 Hotel Blind (2016)
 Fortnite (2017)

References

External links

 Christian Allen at Linkedin
 Christian Allen at Halopedia, the Halo wiki

 Christian Allen's Blog
 Gamasutra Blog

Living people
American video game designers
Bungie
Artists from Anchorage, Alaska
People from Anchorage, Alaska
Tom Clancy
Year of birth missing (living people)